Kroppenstedt is a town in the Börde district, in Saxony-Anhalt, Germany, formerly known as Croppenstedt in the Kingdom of Prussia. It is situated southwest of Magdeburg and is part of the Verbandsgemeinde ("collective municipality") Westliche Börde.

One of its most famous sons was the evangelist and philanthropist George Müller, who later moved to Bristol and founded the Ashley Down orphanage.

References

Börde (district)